El Collao Province is a province of the Puno Region in Peru, created in 1992. The capital of the province is the city of Ilave.

Political division 
The province measures  and is divided into five districts:

Geography 
Some of the highest peaks of the province are Panti Usu and Suri. Other mountains are listed below:

Ethnic groups 
The people in the province are mainly indigenous citizens of Aymara descent. Aymara is the language which the majority of the population (76.51%) learnt to speak in childhood, 22.57% of the residents started speaking using the Spanish language and  0.65% using Quechua (2007 Peru Census).

See also 
 Lurisquta
 Qillqatani
 Q'axilu

References 

Provinces of the Puno Region